Forbidden Planet is the trading name of three separate businesses with online and retail bookstores selling science fiction, fantasy and popular culture products. They can all trace their history to a store opened in London in 1978 named after the 1956 feature film of the same name. Specialising in movie and television merchandise, the shops sell comic books, graphic novels, fantasy and horror, manga, DVDs, video games, and a wide variety of toys, clothing, and other collectible merchandise.

History

Founding
Forbidden Planet London was the third major comics store in the city, eventually replacing what had been the leading shop, Derek Stokes's Dark They Were, and Golden-Eyed,  which had started in 1969, and coming after Frank and Joan Dobson's Weird Fantasy in New Cross. Much of FP's growth came after the demise of Dark They Were, and Golden-Eyed, which went out of business in 1981. Mike Lake, Nick Landau, and Mike Luckman founded Forbidden Planet alongside Titan Distributors (Titan having grown out of Comic Media Distributors).

The first Forbidden Planet began life in 1978 as a small store in Denmark Street. As the scope of the store expanded beyond comics to embrace film and television, a second store was opened just around the corner on St Giles High Street. The store's success led to overcrowding, necessitating a move to much larger premises on New Oxford Street. The original partners, in addition to improving their London store, paired with James Hamilton and Kenny Penman (today the main shareholders in Forbidden Planet International with Andrew Oddie, Richard Boxall and Colin Campbell) to open other stores. Penman and Hamilton were owners of one of the UK's oldest comics and SF stores, Science Fiction Bookshop, in Edinburgh, which opened around 1975.
The first New York store opened in the early 1980s. It was originally located at 56 East 12th Street and Broadway in Greenwich Village. The store had one of the most extensive selections in the world of in-print science fiction and fantasy paperbacks, primarily from major genre labels such as Ballantine, Del Rey, Ace, and so on, but also some small press materials. There were also large and small press magazines, some hardbacks, tie-in toys and merchandise, and comics. They occasionally had book signing appearances by famous authors such as Douglas Adams. The location across the street from the Strand Bookstore and less than a mile from Baird Searles' The Science Fiction Shop made the area a mecca for genre fans.

An additional New York store opened in the mid-1980s at 227 East 59th Street in Lenox Hill, with a smaller selection. Rising rent led to its closure in the 1990s.

In the 1990s, the primary New York store moved across the street to a significantly smaller space at 840 Broadway and East 13th Street, and the focus became comic books and graphic novels, with a greatly diminished selection of traditional fiction.

Expansion

In 1992/1993, the original chain split into two firms, called Forbidden Planet and Forbidden Planet Scotland (later renamed Forbidden Planet International). Forbidden Planet International grew beyond Scotland to include stores throughout the Midlands, in Wales, Northern Ireland, Ireland, and majority ownership of two stores in New York City.

On 30 September 2003, the London store moved to even bigger premises at the northern end of Shaftesbury Avenue.

Forbidden Planet opened a second Megastore in Clifton Heights in Bristol in 2005, and a third in Southampton in 2007. In 2006 the company launched forbiddenplanet.com, an e-commerce retail site offering a wide range of products and hosting details of the company's many events and signings.

On 24 July 2012, the New York City store moved several doors south to 832 Broadway, where it would enjoy 3,400 square feet of retail space. The New York store is not part of Forbidden Planet International, as they are owned by rival organizations.

Like many comics and gaming related stores, Forbidden Planet struggled during the COVID-19 pandemic. The New York branch launched a GoFundMe to survive, in light of the city's high rent.

Companies

Forbidden Planet Ltd

Forbidden Planet Ltd is owned by Titan Entertainment Group and operate a chain of nine stores around England and an online presence at ForbiddenPlanet.com. They also host signings and events with authors, artists, and other figures from cult media.

 Birmingham
 Bristol
 Cambridge
 Coventry
 Croydon
 Liverpool
 London
 Newcastle Upon Tyne
 Southampton

Forbidden Planet International

Forbidden Planet (Scotland) Ltd operate a separate chain of stores around the UK and an online store at comics.forbiddenplanet.co.uk

Belfast
Birmingham (Worlds apart, formerly Nostalgia & Comics; Associate Store)
Brighton
Cardiff
Dublin
Edinburgh
Glasgow
Kingston upon Hull
Leeds 
Leicester
Liverpool (Worlds Apart; Associate Store)
Manchester 
Middlesbrough
Nottingham
Sheffield
Stoke-on-Trent - Hanley
Wolverhampton

Forbidden Planet NYC

Forbidden Planet NYC is an independent store in New York City with an online store at fpnyc.com.

In popular culture

In comics
 The Denmark Street store appeared in a Captain Britain story that ran in The Daredevils issues No. 3 and No. 4 (March–April 1983).
 The 1987 comic book The New Mutants Annual No. 3 features a scene in which a global duel between Warlock and Impossible Man ruins the London shop and the car of founder Mike Lake, who is horrified at the damage.
 Landau, Luckman, and Lake, a fictional organisation appearing in Marvel Comics, is named for the original three founders.
 The New York store was featured in an issue of The Authority vol. 4, No. 2 (November 2008). When the eponymous superhero team ends up in the real world, they visit Forbidden Planet and discover comic books that feature them.
 In the foreword to the 2015 Artist's Proof Edition of The Walking Dead No. 1, editor Sean Mackiewicz states that he was first drawn to the 2003 debut issue of that series through the artwork of co-creator Tony Moore, when he discovered the issue at the Forbidden Planet store in Manhattan, commenting, "the old one on the corner southeast corner of 13th & Broadway".

In other media
 One of the potential flatmates interviewed in the 1994 feature film Shallow Grave prominently holds a Forbidden Planet carrier bag.
 Forbidden Planet London store employee Jan Waicek was quoted in the May 2000 issue of Maxim magazine, in an article titled, "Hardest of the Hardcore", which examined various items with extreme statistics or traits ("Hardest Dinosaur", "Hardest Natural Disaster", "Hardest Aircraft", etc.). Waicek was asked his opinion on who is the "Hardest Superhero", and cited Wolverine's adamantium skeleton and claws, and Superman's near-invulnerability.
 The Forbidden Planet London Megastore was feature in an episode of The Apprentice when the contestants visited the store to try to pitch a board game idea to the store manager.
 In the 2011 fantasy novel Skulduggery Pleasant: Death Bringer, Darquesse crashes through the Dublin store's window and remarks, "A comic store. How fitting."

Notes

References 
 Sabin, Roger. Adult Comics: An Introduction (London: Routledge, 1993), pp. 64, 96, and 268. 
 Sabin, Roger. Comics, Comix & Graphic Novels (London: Phaidon, 1996), p. 157.

External links

Official site of Forbidden Planet
Flickr history of Forbidden Planet's events
Official site of Forbidden Planet NYC
Official site of Forbidden Planet International
Official podcast of Forbidden Planet International
ComicSpace site of Forbidden Planet International

Comics retailers
Speculative fiction
Titan Entertainment Group
Bookshops of England
1978 establishments in the United Kingdom